Lu Xuechang (June 25, 1964 – February 20, 2014) was a sixth generation Chinese film director. One of a new crop of talented filmmakers, Lu directed four feature films beginning with his debut, The Making of Steel in 1997.

Like many of his present-day peers, critics have seen elements of foreign filmmakers in Lu's work with Lu himself claiming to enjoy Italian cinema (although he stops short of naming specific influences). Also commensurate with his peers Lu had his share of run-ins with the censors. The Making of Steel, for example, was recut six times before it was allowed to be screened.

Filmography

References

External links 
 
 
 Lu Xuechang at the Chinese Movie Database

Film directors from Beijing
Screenwriters from Beijing
1964 births
2014 deaths